Brett Butler may refer to:

Brett Butler (actress) (born 1958), American actress, writer and stand-up comedy performer
Brett Butler (baseball) (born 1957), American baseball center fielder
Brett Butler (racing driver) (born 1985), American NASCAR driver

See also
Butler (surname)